Patrick Weekes is an American author. They are a writer at BioWare who has written for both the Mass Effect and the Dragon Age writing team. In 2015 Weekes replaced David Gaider as the Lead Writer for the Dragon Age franchise.

Career

Early life and education 
They were born in California and attended Stanford University, where they received a B.A. and an M.A. in English Literature.

BioWare 
Weekes is a writer at BioWare. They have written for both the Mass Effect and Dragon Age franchises, writing for the main video game installments as well as adaptions of the series in books, including the novel Dragon Age: The Masked Empire and two stories for the anthology Dragon Age: Tevinter Nights. Following David Gaider's departure from the Dragon Age franchise in 2015, Weekes became the lead writer for the franchise.

Personal life 
Patrick lives in Edmonton, Canada with their wife Karin Weekes and their two sons. Weekes uses they and them pronouns.

Bibliography

Games
 Mass Effect (Writer)
 Dragon Age: Origins (Additional Design)
 Mass Effect 2 (Writer)
 Mass Effect 2: Lair of the Shadow Broker (Writer)
 Mass Effect 3 (Senior Writer)
 Mass Effect 3: From Ashes (Writer)
 Mass Effect 3: Leviathan (Writer)
 Mass Effect 3: Citadel (Writer)
 Dragon Age: Inquisition (Writer)
 Dragon Age: Inquisition - Jaws of Hakkon (Lead Writer) 
 Dragon Age: Inquisition - Trespasser (Lead Writer)

Comics

Mass Effect: Homeworlds #2 (with Jeremy Barlow, Chris Staggs and Michael Atiyeh, Dark Horse, 2012)

Novels

Rogues of the Republic
The Palace Job (2013)
The Prophecy Con (2014)
The Paladin Caper (2015)

Dragon Age
Dragon Age: The Masked Empire (2014)
Dragon Age: Tevinter Nights (2020)

Other
Feeder (2018)

Short stories
 “Dragon Slayers” in Realms of Fantasy Issue 27 (February 1999)
 “Glass Beads” in Science Fiction Age Volume 8 Issue 4 (May 2000)
 “I Am Looking for a Book...” in Shelf Life: Fantastic Stories Celebrating Bookstores (2002, edited by Greg Ketter)
 “Why the Elders Bare Their Throats” in Strange Horizons (17 February 2003)
 “When She Grows a Soul” in The Leading Edge Issue 46 (October 2003)
 “Injure the Corners” in Amazing Stories Issue 604 (October 2004)
 “Release the Knot” in Amazing Stories Issue 606 (December 2004)
 “Unleashing the Flyers of L” in The Anthology from Hell: Humorous Stories from WAY Down Under (2012, edited by Julia S. Mandala)

References

External links
 
 
 

21st-century American novelists
American fantasy writers
American science fiction writers
American male novelists
Living people
American male short story writers
21st-century American short story writers
BioWare people
21st-century American male writers
Year of birth missing (living people)